Eucalyptus crucis is a species of mallee that is endemic to Western Australia. There are three subspecies, commonly known as silver mallee or Southern Cross mallee, (subspecies crucis), narrow-leaved silver mallee, (subsp. lanceolata) and Paynes Find mallee, (subsp. praecipua). It has rough bark that is shed in curling flakes, more or less round, glaucous juvenile leaves, egg-shaped intermediate leaves and lance-shaped adult leaves. The type of bark and the proportion of juvenile, intermediate and adult leaves in the crown of mature plants varies with subspecies. The flower buds are arranged in groups of seven in leaf axils, the flowers are whitish to pale yellow and the fruit is a conical to hemispherical capsule.

Description

Taxonomy and naming
Eucalyptus crucis was first formally described in 1923 by Joseph Maiden from a specimen collected near Southern Cross by Henry Steedman in 1922. Maiden published the description in his book A Critical Revision of the Genus Eucalyptus. The specific epithet (crucis) is a Latin word meaning "cross", referring to the type location.

In 1982, Ian Brooker and Stephen Hopper described two subspecies, crucis and lanceolata, and in 1993 they described subspecies praecipua. The three subspecies have been accepted by the Australian Plant Census.
 Eucalyptus crucis subsp. crucis has a crown composed of glaucous juvenile leaves;
 Eucalyptus crucis subsp. lanceolata has a crown of greyish green adult leaves;
 Eucalyptus crucis subsp. praecipua has a crown of adult leaves but they are larger than in subspecies lanceolata and the bark is only the "minni ritchi" type on the thinner branches.

Distribution and habitat
Silver mallee is found in an area in the Goldfields-Esperance and Wheatbelt region of Western Australia where it grows in sandy, clay or loam soils amongst granite outcrops. It is associated with sheoak (Allocasuarina species), wattle (Acacia species) and one-sided bottlebrush
(Calothamnus species).

Subspecies crucis is only found between Merredin, Southern Cross and Westonia, subspecies lanceolata between Corrigin, Mount Churchman and Chiddarcooping Rock. Subspecies praecipua is only known from near Paynes Find.

Conservation status
Subspecies lanceolata is classified as "not threatened" but subspecies crucis and praecipua are classified as "Threatened Flora (Declared Rare Flora — Extant)" by the Department of Environment and Conservation (Western Australia). Subspecies crucis (silver mallee) is also listed as "vulnerable" under the Australian Government Environment Protection and Biodiversity Conservation Act 1999. The main threats to this subspecies are recreational activities, pipeline maintenance, grazing and weed invasion.

Use in horticulture
This eucalypt is frost and drought tolerant and is suitable for alkaline soils. It is commonly used as a windbreak, a street tree, for its decorative fruit, for erosion control, and as a honey producing or bird nesting plant.

See also
List of Eucalyptus species

References

crucis
Endemic flora of Western Australia
Mallees (habit)
Myrtales of Australia
Eucalypts of Western Australia
Goldfields-Esperance
Wheatbelt (Western Australia)
Plants described in 1923
Taxa named by Joseph Maiden